John Alysaundre of Charmouth was an English politician who was MP for Melcombe Regis in December 1421 and Lyme Regis in 1432.

References

English MPs December 1421
English MPs 1432
Members of the Parliament of England (pre-1707) for Lyme Regis
Members of the Parliament of England (pre-1707) for Melcombe Regis